Answer commonly refers to response to a question.

Answer may also refer to:

Music
 Answer, an element of a fugue

Albums
 Answer (Angela Aki album), 2009
 Answer (Supercar album), 2004
 Answers (album), 1994
 The Answers, an album by Blue October

Songs
"Answer" (Tohoshinki song)
"Answer" (Flow song), 2007
"Answer", by Tyler, the Creator from the album Wolf
"Answer", by Sarah McLachlan from her 2003 album Afterglow
"Answer", by Mayu Maeshima, opening song from the 2021 anime Full Dive

Publications
Answers (periodical), British weekly paper founded in 1888, initially titled Answers to Correspondents
"Answer", a science-fiction story published in 1954 by Fredric Brown
Answers, an American magazine published by Answers in Genesis
The Questionnaire (Salomon novel), also published as "The Answers"

Answer engines 
 Answers.com
 Yahoo! Answers

Groups, organizations, companies 
 Answer Studio, a company launched by employees of Walt Disney Animation Japan its closure in 2004
 A.N.S.W.E.R., Act Now to Stop War and End Racism, an American protest group

Other uses 
 Answer (law), any reply to a question, counter-statement or defense in a legal procedure
 HMS Answer, a British Royal Navy ship name, and list of ships with that name

See also

 The Answer (disambiguation)
 Question answering, a computer science discipline
 Questions and answers (disambiguation)
 Ask (disambiguation)
 Question (disambiguation)